Perrette Souplex is a French film and television actress.

Selected filmography
 Paris Still Sings (1951)
 The Dream of Andalusia (1951)
 La smala (1984)

References

Bibliography
 Maurice Bessy, André Bernard & Raymond Chirat. Histoire du cinéma français: 1951-1955. Pygmalion, 1989.

External links

1930 births
Living people
French film actresses
French stage actresses
French television actresses
Actresses from Paris